Silvio Ezequiel Romero (born 22 July 1988) is an Argentine professional footballer who plays as a striker for Campeonato Brasileiro Série A club Fortaleza, on loan from Independiente.

Career

Early career
Romero began his career with Instituto de Córdoba at the age of 17, playing with the club until transferring to Lanús in 2010. Romero joined French Ligue 1 side Stade Rennes on loan during the 2013–14 season. After the loan spell, Mexican club Monarcas Morelia succeeded in obtaining him in the summer of 2014; however he failed to pass a medical ahead of the official signing due to a mild virus he had contracted while in France.

In 2015, Romero signed with Mexican club Chiapas. In his first tournament with the club – the 2015 Clausura – he played in 11 matches and only managed to score one goal. In his first full season with the club, Romero's performance had improved, scoring 18 goals (10 in the 2015 Apertura and 8 in the 2016 Clausura), as well as 8 assists.

América
On 8 June 2016, it was announced that Romero was sold to Club América for a rumored $8 million. He scored 10 league goals as América finished runners-up in the league, as well as scoring two goals at the 2016 FIFA Club World Cup.

Honours
Fortaleza
Copa do Nordeste: 2022
Campeonato Cearense: 2022

References

External links

1988 births
Living people
Association football forwards
Argentine footballers
Club Atlético Lanús footballers
Instituto footballers
Stade Rennais F.C. players
Chiapas F.C. footballers
Club América footballers
Club Atlético Independiente footballers
Fortaleza Esporte Clube players
Argentine Primera División players
Primera Nacional players
Ligue 1 players
Liga MX players
Campeonato Brasileiro Série A players
Argentine expatriate footballers
Argentine expatriate sportspeople in France
Expatriate footballers in France
Argentine expatriate sportspeople in Mexico
Expatriate footballers in Mexico
Argentine expatriate sportspeople in Brazil
Expatriate footballers in Brazil
Footballers from Córdoba, Argentina